

List of Odonata of the Dang, Gujarat. 

The following is a list of the dragonflies and damselflies found in Dang, Gujarat.

Suborder: Anisoptera

Family : Aeshnidae

Anax guttatus

Anax immaculifrons

Family : Gomphidae

Burmagomphus laidlawi

Cyclogomphus ypsilon

Ictinogomphus rapax

Microgomphus torquatus

Onychogomphus acinaces

Paragomphus lineatus

Family : Macromiidae

Epophthalmia vittata

Family : Libellulidae

Acisoma panorpoides

Brachydiplax sobrina

Brachythemis contaminata

Bradinopyga geminata

Crocothemis servilia

Diaplacodes lefebvrii

Diaplacodes trivialis

Hylaeothemis indica

Lathrecista asiatica

Neurothemis intermedia

Neurothemis tullia

Orthetrum glaucum

Orthetrum luzonicum

Orthetrum pruinosum neglectum

Orthetrum sabina

Orthetrum taeniolatum

Pantala flavescens

Potamarcha congener

Rhodothemis rufa

Rhyothemis variegata

Tetrathemis platyptera

Tholymis tillarga

Tramea basilaris

Tramea limbata

Trithemis aurora

Trithemis festiva

Trithemis pallidinervis

Trithemis kirbyi

Urothemis signata

Zyxomma petiolatum

Suborder: Zygoptera

Family :Lestidae

Lestes elatus

Lestes thoracicus

Lestes umbrinus

Lestes viridulus

Family: Euphaeidae

Dysphaea ethela

Family: Platycnemididae

Copera marginipes

Disparoneura quadrimaculata

Elattoneura nigerrima

Family : Coenagrionidae

Agriocnemis pygmaea

Agriocnemis splendidissima

Ceriagrion coromandelianum

Enallagma parvum

Ischnura aurora

Ischnura elegans

Ischnura nursei

Ischnura senegalensis

Paracercion malayanum

Pseudagrion decorum

Pseudagrion hypermelas

Pseudagrion microcephalum

Pseudagrion rubriceps

Pseudagrion spencei 
Epophthalmia vittata

Fauna of Gujarat
Odonata of Asia